Oligodon woodmasoni is a species of snake in the family Colubridae. The species is endemic to the Nicobar Islands of India.

Etymology
The specific name, woodmasoni, is in honor of English zoologist James Wood-Mason.

Description
M.A. Smith reported that the holotype of this species was missing from the ZSI Kolkata collections. The species was rediscovered in 2002 and a new specimen was deposited at the ZSI.

The details of the specimen, ZSI25503 are as follows:

Snout-to-vent length: . Tail length: . Dorsal scale rows: at neck 18; at midbody 17. Ventrals: 185. Subcaudals: 46. Supralabials: 6 (4th in contact with the eye). Infralabials: 7.

Reproduction
O. woodmasoni is oviparous.

References

Further reading
Boulenger GA (1894). Catalogue of the Snakes in the British Museum (Natural History). Volume II., Containing the Conclusion of the Colubridæ Aglyphæ. London: Trustees of the British Museum (Natural History). (Taylor and Francis, printers). xi + 382 pp. + Plates I-XX. (Simotes woodmasoni, p. 223).
Sharma RC (2003). Handbook: Indian Snakes. Kolkata: Zoological Survey of India. 292 pp. .
Smith MA (1943). The Fauna of British India, Ceylon and Burma, Including the Whole of the Indo-Chinese Sub-region. Reptilia and Amphibia. Vol. III.—Serpentes. London: Secretary of State for India. (Taylor and Francis, printers). xii + 583 pp. (Oligodon woodmasoni, pp. 218–219, Figure 73).
Vijayakumar SP, David P (2006). "Taxonomy, Natural History, and Distribution of the Snakes of the Nicobar Islands (India), Based on New Materials and with an Emphasis on Endemic Species". Russian Journal of Herpetology 13 (1): 11–40.

woodmasoni
Reptiles of India
Endemic fauna of the Nicobar Islands
Taxa named by William Lutley Sclater
Reptiles described in 1891